In the U.S. state of Nebraska, the Nebraska Department of Transportation (NDOT) maintains a system of state highways. Every significant section of roadway maintained by the state is assigned a number, officially State Highway No. X but also commonly referred to as Nebraska Highway X, as well as N-X. State highways are signed with a white trapezoidal field on a black background with the state, route number and oxen pulled covered wagon displayed in black (see ). Along with the state highways are a system of spurs and links which provide additional access points for the state highway system. In addition, the Nebraska Game and Parks Commission has designated some roads as Recreational Roads which are maintained by NDOT but are mostly unsigned.



State highways

See also

References

External links
Nebraska Department of Roads
Nebraska Roads

 
State highways